Evli may refer to:
 Ughli, Iran
 Uli, Iran